Duo is an album by pianist Kenny Drew  and bassist Niels-Henning Ørsted Pedersen recorded in 1973 and released on the SteepleChase label.

On first pressings of the original vinyl edition of this recording, the first and last titles on the first side (tracks 1 and 6 as listed below) are switched on the back cover track listing, but are correct on the labels.

Reception
The AllMusic review awarded the album 4 stars.

Track listing
All compositions by Kenny Drew except as indicated
 "I Skovens Dybe Stille Ro" (Traditional)2:49  
 "Come Summer"3:12  
 "Lullabye" (Niels-Henning Ørsted Pedersen)0:50  
 "Kristine" (Pedersen)5:26  
 "Serenity"4:36  
 "Det Var en Lørdag Aften" (Traditional)3:41  
 "Do You Know What It Means to Miss New Orleans?" (Louis Alter, Eddie DeLange)4:09  
 "Wave" (Antonio Carlos Jobim)5:22  
 "Duo Trip"2:36  
 "Hush-A-Bye" (Traditional)7:56  
 "I Skovens Dybe Stille Ro" [alternate take] (Traditional)2:46 Bonus track on CD

Personnel
Kenny Drewpiano
Niels-Henning Ørsted Pedersenbass

References

Kenny Drew albums
Niels-Henning Ørsted Pedersen albums
1973 albums
SteepleChase Records albums
Collaborative albums